is a Prefectural Natural Park in Miyagi Prefecture, Japan. First designated for protection in 1940, the park is within the municipality of Ishinomaki and centres upon Mount Asahi.

See also
 National Parks of Japan

References

External links
  Map of Asahiyama Prefectural Natural Park (18)

Parks and gardens in Miyagi Prefecture
Protected areas established in 1940
1940 establishments in Japan
Ishinomaki